Kenya women's national rugby sevens team plays in several tournaments including the African Women's Sevens Championship, Dubai Invitational Sevens and the Hong Kong Women's Sevens.

Kenya's captain Aberdeen Shikoyi died on 29 May 2012 after an injury she sustained in a match against Uganda.

Kenya qualified for the 2016 Summer Olympics by winning the 2015 Women's Africa Cup Sevens.  In 2019, despite coming second at the Africa Women's Sevens, they qualified for the Tokyo Olympics because South Africa declined their regional spot.

Tournament history

Summer Olympics

Commonwealth Games

Rugby Africa Women's Sevens

Team

Previous squads

 Philadelphia Olando (c)
 Sheila Chajira
 Celestine Masinde
 Janet Awino
 Janet Okello
 Doreen Remour
 Rachel Mbogo
 Stacy Awuor
 Linet Arasa
 Sinaida Aura
 Grace Adhiambo
 Cynthia Atieno
 Judith Auma

References

External links
Official website
WorldRugby profile

Women's national rugby sevens teams
Sevens